The following is a list of accidents and incidents involving the Boeing 737 family of jet airliners, including the Boeing 737 Original (737-100/200), Boeing 737 Classic (737-300/-400/-500), Boeing 737 Next Generation (737-600/-700/-800/-900) and Boeing 737 MAX (737 MAX 7/8/200/9/10) series of aircraft. , there has been a total of 503 aviation accidents and incidents involving all 737 aircraft, including 219 hull losses resulting in a total of 5,717 fatalities.

The 737 first entered airline service in February 1968; the 10,000th aircraft entered service in March 2018. The first accident involving a 737 was on July 19, 1970, when a 737-200 was damaged beyond repair during an aborted takeoff, with no fatalities; the first fatal accident occurred on December 8, 1972, when United Airlines Flight 553 crashed while attempting to land, with 45 (43 on board plus 2 on the ground) fatalities; and, as of November 2018, the greatest loss of life aboard a 737 occurred on October 29, 2018, when Lion Air Flight 610, a 737 MAX 8, crashed into the Java Sea shortly after takeoff, with 189 fatalities.

Several accidents of the 737 Original and Classic series were due to a design flaw in a power control unit (PCU) causing uncommanded rudder movement under thermal shock: see Boeing 737 rudder issues for further info.

In October 2018 and March 2019, two fatal crashes of 737 MAX aircraft led to a worldwide grounding of all 737 MAX aircraft until December 2020.

737 Original (-100/-200) aircraft

1970s
 July 19, 1970 – United Airlines Flight 611, a new 737-200 (registration N9005U "City of Bristol") was damaged beyond economical repair after an aborted take off at Philadelphia International Airport. During take off, a loud "bang" was heard, and the aircraft veered right. The captain aborted the take off, and the aircraft ran off the end of the runway, stopping 1634 feet past its end, in a field. There were no fatalities. This was the first, non-fatal, accident involving a 737.
 July 5, 1972 – Pacific Southwest Airlines Flight 710 was hijacked by two men who demanded $800,000 and that they be taken to the Soviet Union. In San Francisco, the aircraft was stormed and the two hijackers died along with one passenger.

 December 8, 1972 – United Airlines Flight 553, a 737-200 registration N9031U, crashed while attempting to land at Chicago Midway International Airport after pilot error allowed the plane to stall. Two people on the ground and 43 of the 61 passengers and crew on board died. This was the first fatal accident involving a 737.
 May 31, 1973 – Indian Airlines Flight 440, a 737-200, hit power lines and crashed on approach to Palam International Airport in New Delhi, India. The cause was determined to be crew error in letting the aircraft descend below glidepath. 48 of the 65 passengers and crew on board died.
 December 17, 1973 – In the wake of the events surrounding Pan Am Flight 110, a parked Lufthansa 737-100 (registered D-ABEY) was hijacked at Leonardo da Vinci-Fiumicino Airport in Rome. Two pilots and two flight attendants were on board preparing the aircraft for departure to Munich when five Palestinian terrorists entered the aircraft with ten Italian hostages taken from the airport. The crew were then forced to fly the aircraft to Athens and then on to several other airports, until the ordeal ended at Kuwait International Airport the next day, where the hijackers surrendered.
 March 31, 1975 – Western Airlines Flight 470, a 737-200 (registration N4527W) overshot a runway coated with snow at Casper/Natrona County International Airport in Casper, Wyoming in the United States. Four of the 99 aboard were injured, and the aircraft was damaged beyond repair.
 October 13, 1977 – Lufthansa Flight 181 was hijacked by four Palestinians, who demanded the release of seven Red Army Faction members in West German prisons and $15,000,000. The captain was fatally shot. On October 17, members of West Germany's GSG-9 stormed the aircraft and killed three of the hijackers, capturing the other.
 December 4, 1977 – Malaysian Airline System Flight 653, a 737-200 registration 9M-MBD, crashed following a phugoid oscillation that saw the aircraft diving into a swamp after both its pilots were shot following a hijacking attempt. The crash happened in the Southern Malaysian state of Johor. A total of 93 passengers and seven crew died.
 February 11, 1978 – Pacific Western Airlines Flight 314, a 737-200, crashed while attempting to land at Cranbrook Airport, British Columbia, Canada. The aircraft crashed after thrust reversers did not fully stow following a go-around that was executed in order to avoid a snowplow. Four of the crew members and 38 of the 44 passengers died in the crash.
 April 26, 1979 – An Indian Airlines 737-200 was damaged by a bomb that detonated in the forward lavatory. The aircraft made a flapless landing in Chennai, India.

1980s
 November 4, 1980 – TAAG Angola Airlines 737-200 registration D2-TAA, that landed short of the runway at Benguela Airport, slid some 900 m following the collapse of the gear; a fire broke out in the right wing but there were no reported fatalities. The aircraft caught fire again during recovery operations the next day and was written off.
 May 2, 1981 – Aer Lingus Flight 164, a 737-200, was hijacked en route from Dublin Airport, Ireland to London's Heathrow Airport, UK. While on approach to Heathrow, about five minutes before the flight was due to land, a 55-year-old Australian man went into the toilet and doused himself in petrol. He then went to the cockpit and demanded that the aircraft be diverted to Le Touquet – Côte d'Opale Airport in France, and refuel there for a flight to Tehran, Iran. Upon landing at Le Touquet and after an eight-hour standoff (during which time 11 of 112 hostages were released), French special forces stormed the aircraft and apprehended hijacker Lawrence Downey. No shots were fired and nobody was injured.
 August 22, 1981 – Far Eastern Air Transport Flight 103, a 737-200 (registration B-2603) broke apart in mid-air and crashed 14 minutes after taking off from Taipei Songshan Airport. All 6 crew and 104 passengers died.
 January 13, 1982 – Air Florida Flight 90, a 737-200, crashed in a severe snowstorm, immediately after takeoff from Washington National Airport, hitting the 14th Street Bridge and fell into the ice-covered Potomac River in Washington, D.C. All but five of the 74 passengers and five crew members died; four motorists on the bridge also died.
 May 25, 1982 – VASP 737-200 registration PP-SMY, made a hard landing and touched down on its nose gear first at Brasília in rainy conditions. The gear collapsed and the aircraft skidded off the runway breaking in two. Two passengers out of 118 occupants died.
 August 26, 1982 – Southwest Air Lines Flight 611, a 737-200 (registration JA8444) overran the runway at Ishigaki Airport in Japan and was destroyed. There were no fatalities but some were injured during the emergency evacuation.
 March 27, 1983 – LAM Mozambique Airlines 737-200 registration C9-BAB. Undercarriage failure after landing some 400 metres (1,300 ft) short of the runway at Quelimane Airport. There were no fatalities.
 July 11, 1983 – TAME 737-200 registration HC-BIG, crashed while attempting to land at Mariscal Lamar Airport; all 111 passengers and eight crew on board died. The cause of the crash was a CFIT (Controlled Flight Into Terrain) as a result of the pilot's inexperience with the aircraft. It remains the deadliest aviation accident in Ecuadorean history. after a radio station reported witnesses to a mid-air explosion.
 September 23, 1983 – Gulf Air Flight 771, a 737-200 (registration A40-BK) crashed after a bomb exploded in the baggage compartment causing it to stall and come down in the desert, near Mina Jebel Ali between Abu Dhabi and Dubai in the United Arab Emirates. All 5 crew and 107 passengers died.
 November 8, 1983 – TAAG Angola Airlines Flight 462 stalled and crashed shortly after taking off from Lubango Mukanka Airport in Angola resulting in the deaths of all its 130 occupants (126 passengers and 4 crew) on board. Local guerilla force UNITA claimed it had brought the aircraft down with a Surface-to-air missile.
 February 9, 1984 – TAAG Angola Airlines 737-200 registration D2-TBV, that departed from Albano Machado Airport operating a scheduled passenger service, suffered hydraulic problems following an explosion in the rear of the aircraft and returned to the airport of departure for an emergency landing. The aircraft touched down fast and overran the runway.
 March 22, 1984 – Pacific Western Airlines Flight 501, a 737-200 regularly scheduled flight that caught fire in Calgary, Alberta, Canada. Five people were seriously injured and 22 suffered minor injuries, but no-one died.
 August 30, 1984 – Cameroon Airlines Flight 786, a 737-200 (registration TJ-CBD) caught fire as the aircraft was taxiing out for takeoff at Douala International Airport in Douala, Cameroon. 107 of 109 passengers and two crew were reported to have survived.
 November 23, 1985 – Egyptair flight 648 737-200 was hijacked by 3 Palestinian men en route to Cairo international airport from Athens. The plane was ordered to land in Malta by the hijackers. Later, Egyptian commandos raided the aircraft. During the raid, 60 passengers died, including 3 hijackers, and 38 survived, including 1 hijacker.
 June 21, 1985 – Braathens SAFE Flight 139, a 737-200 that was hijacked at the Trondheim Airport in Værnes, Norway. The aircraft was stormed and the hijacker arrested.
 August 22, 1985 – British Airtours Flight 28M, a 737-200, aborted its takeoff at Manchester Airport, UK, after it caught fire due to a crack in one of the combustors of the left Pratt & Whitney JT8D-15 engine. Of the 136 passengers and crew on board, 56 died, most due to toxic smoke inhalation. Research following the accident investigation led to many innovations in air safety, including a redesign of the 737's galley area.
 January 28, 1986 – VASP Flight 210, a 737-200, tried to take-off from a taxiway at São Paulo-Guarulhos Airport. The take-off was aborted, but the aircraft overran the pavement, collided with a dyke and broke in two. The weather was foggy. There was one fatality.
 October 15, 1986 – Iran Air 737-200 registration EP-IRG was attacked by Iraqi aircraft. Passengers were disembarking at the time of the attack. According to Iranian authorities some C-130 Hercules aircraft were also destroyed. Three occupants died.
 December 25, 1986 – Iraqi Airways Flight 163, a 737-200 that was hijacked and crashed, catching fire near Arar in Saudi Arabia. There were 106 people on board, and 60 passengers and 3 crew members died.
 August 4, 1987 – LAN Chile 737-200 registration CC-CHJ, landed short of the displaced threshold of runway 27 at El Loa Airport, Chile. The nosegear collapsed and the aircraft broke in two. A fire broke out 30 minutes later and destroyed the aircraft. The threshold was displaced by 880m due to construction work. There was one fatality.
 August 31, 1987 – Thai Airways Flight 365, a 737-200 (registration HS-TBC) crashed into the sea off Ko Phuket, Thailand. A total of 74 passengers and 9 crew on board lost their lives.
 December 5, 1987 – USAir Flight 224, a Boeing 737-200 on its way to Boston, had just taken off from Philadelphia International Airport and had climbed to about 4,000 feet when three engine mount bolts and a secondary support cable holding the right engine separated in flight while flying over New Jersey. The pilot was able to safely return the aircraft using its remaining engine to the airport in Philadelphia. The engine was later recovered in a field near Deptford, New Jersey.
 January 2, 1988 – Condor Flugdienst Flight 3782, a 737-200 on a charter flight, crashed in Serefsihar near Izmir, Turkey, due to ILS problems. All 11 passengers and 5 crew died in the accident.

A flight attendant, Clarabelle (C.B.) Lansing, who was not in restraints at the moment of decompression, was blown out of the aircraft over the ocean and her body was never found.
 September 15, 1988 – Ethiopian Airlines Flight 604, a 737-200, suffered a multiple bird strike while taking off from Bahir Dar Airport. Both engines failed and the airliner crashed and caught fire while trying to return to the airport. Thirty-five of 98 passengers died while all six crew members survived.
 September 26, 1988 – Aerolíneas Argentinas 737-200 registration LV-LIU operating Flight 648 departed in Jorge Newbery Airport in Buenos Aires, Argentina and made an emergency landing at Ushuaia Airport in Ushuaia, Argentina. There were no fatalities.
 January 20, 1989 – Piedmont Airlines Flight 1480, a Boeing 737-200, had an engine separation just two minutes after takeoff from O'Hare International Airport in Chicago. The pilot was able to safely return to the same airport. The engine was recovered in an open field within the airport grounds just half-mile beyond the end of the runway.
 February 9, 1989 – LAM Mozambique Airlines 737-200 registration C9-BAD overran the runway while making an emergency landing at Lichinga Airport. There were no fatalities.
Out of 54 occupants, there were 13 fatalities, all of them passengers. The survivors were discovered two days later.

1990s
 October 2, 1990 – The 1990 Guangzhou Baiyun airport collisions were the result of the hijacking of Xiamen Airlines Flight 8301, a 737-200 (registration B-2510). Whilst attempting to land at Guangzhou Baiyun it struck two other airplanes. The hijacked aircraft struck a parked China Southwest Airlines Boeing 707 first, inflicting only minor damage, but then collided with China Southern Airlines Flight 2812, a Boeing 757-200 waiting for takeoff, and flipped on its back. A total of 128 people died, including 7 of 9 crew members and 75 of 93 passengers on Flight 8301 and 46 of 110 passengers on Flight 2812.
 March 3, 1991 – United Airlines Flight 585, a 737-200 carrying 20 passengers and five crew members, went out of control after a rudder malfunction and crashed outside of Colorado Springs Municipal Airport; all 25 passengers and crew on board died.
 August 16, 1991 – Indian Airlines Flight 257, a 737-2A8 crashed at Thangjing Hill while on approach to Imphal Airport, killing all 63 passengers and 6 crew members on board.
 June 6, 1992 – Copa Airlines Flight 201, a 737-204 Advanced registration HP-1205CMP en route from Tocumen International Airport in Panama City, Panama to Alfonso Bonilla Aragón International Airport in Cali, Colombia crashed into the Darien Gap 29 minutes after taking-off from Tocumen International Airport. All 47 on board (40 passengers and 7 crew) died in the crash.
 June 22, 1992 – VASP cargo 737-2A1C registration PP-SND en route from Rio Branco to Cruzeiro do Sul crashed in the jungle while on arrival procedures to Cruzeiro do Sul. The crew of two and one passenger died.
 March 8, 1994 – A Sahara Airlines Boeing 737-200 crashed shortly after takeoff at Delhi-Indira Gandhi International Airport, India. The plane slammed into an Aeroflot Ilyushin 86 aircraft, destroying the aircraft. There were no passengers on either aircraft during the crash. All 4 crew members died, along with 5 people on the ground.
 December 21, 1994 – Air Algérie Flight 702P, a 737-200C on behalf of Phoenix Aviation crashed in Coventry, England, UK. All 5 crew members died.
 August 9, 1995 – Aviateca Flight 901, a 737-200 (registration N125GU) crashed on approach to the El Salvador International Airport in San Salvador, El Salvador. All 65 occupants died.
 November 13, 1995 – Nigeria Airways Flight 357, a 737-2F9 (5N-AUA), suffered a runway overrun at Kaduna Airport in Nigeria. All 14 crew members survived, but 11 of the 124 passengers died.
 December 3, 1995 – Cameroon Airlines Flight 3701, a 737-200 (registration TJ-CBE) crashed after the crew lost control on approach to Douala International Airport in Douala, Cameroon. A total of 71 passengers and crew lost their lives, but there were 5 survivors.
 February 29, 1996 – Faucett Flight 251, a 737-200 (registration OB-1451), crashed on approach to Rodríguez Ballón International Airport in Arequipa, Peru. A total of 117 passengers and 6 crew on board lost their lives.
 April 3, 1996 – United States Air Force CT-43A (a modified 737-200) tail number 73-1149 operating in a VIP transport flight, crashed on approach to Dubrovnik Airport in Dubrovnik, Croatia while on an official trade mission. All 5 crew and 30 passengers died, including U.S. Secretary of Commerce Ron Brown and The New York Times Frankfurt Bureau chief Nathaniel C. Nash.
 June 9, 1996 – Eastwind Airlines Flight 517, a 737-200 on a scheduled domestic passenger flight between Trenton-Mercer Airport in Trenton, New Jersey and Richmond International Airport in Richmond, Virginia, experienced a loss of rudder control but the crew were able to land the aircraft successfully. There were no fatalities among the 48 passengers and 4 crew members but one flight attendant suffered minor injuries.
 February 14, 1997 – Varig 737-200, registration PP-CJO operating Flight 265, flying from Marabá to Carajás Airport, veered off the right side of the runway at Carajás during a thunderstorm after its right main landing gear collapsed rearwards. The aircraft ended up in a wooded area, one crew member died.
 May 5, 1998 – Occidental Petroleum 737-200 (FAP-351) leased from the Peruvian Air Force, operating a charter flight from Coronel FAP Francisco Secada Vignetta International Airport in Iquitos, Peru, crashed in rainy weather whilst on approach to Alférez FAP Alfredo Vladimir Sara Bauer Airport in Andoas, Peru. There were 75 fatalities, only eleven passengers and two crew members survived.
 May 10, 1999 – a Mexican Air Force 737-200 was on a training flight when it overran the runway while making an emergency landing at Loma Bonita Air Base, Mexico. The nose gear collapsed. Grass near the aircraft caught fire causing it to burn out. There were no fatalities.
 August 31, 1999 – LAPA Flight 3142, a 737-200, crashed while attempting to take off with an incorrect wing flaps configuration from the Jorge Newbery Airport in Buenos Aires en route to Córdoba, Argentina. The crash resulted in 65 fatalities.

2000s
 April 19, 2000 – Air Philippines Flight 541, a 737-200 flying from Ninoy Aquino International Airport in Manila crashed on approach to Francisco Bangoy International Airport in Davao City, Philippines. All 124 passengers and 7 crew members on board died.
 December 26, 2002 – TAAG Angola Airlines 737-200 registration D2-TDB and operating Flight 572 that had departed from Windhoek Hosea Kutako International Airport bound for Luanda, was involved in a mid-air collision over Namibian airspace with a Cessna 404 propeller-driven light aircraft registration V5-WAA, that had taken off from Windhoek Eros Airport in Namibia. Out of the 46 passengers and crew on the Boeing and 1 pilot on the Cessna, there were no fatalities.
 March 6, 2003 – Air Algérie Flight 6289, a 737-200 crashed shortly after taking off from Tamanrasset, Algeria. All 97 passengers and 6 crew on board perished with the exception of a 28-year-old soldier, Youcef Djillali.
 July 8, 2003 – Sudan Airways Flight 139, a 737-200C (registration ST-AFK) stalled and crashed in Port Sudan, Sudan resulting in the deaths of all its 117 occupants (106 passengers and 11 crew members) on board.
 February 3, 2005 – Kam Air Flight 904, a 737-200 registration EX-037 crashed into the Pamir Mountains in Afghanistan. All 96 passengers and 8 crew members on board lost their lives. The incident is the deadliest air disaster in Afghanistan's aviation history, and the exact cause remains unknown.
 August 23, 2005 – TANS Perú Flight 204, a 737-200 crashed on approach to Pucallpa Airport in Peru. Of the 98 occupants, 40 lost their lives.
 September 5, 2005 – Mandala Airlines Flight 091, a 737-200, crashed in a densely populated neighborhood of Medan, North Sumatra, Indonesia, after the crew commenced the takeoff with the aircraft's flaps deployed to an incorrect position. It was carrying 117 on board, of whom 95 passengers and 5 crew, as well as 49 people on the ground, died.
 October 22, 2005 – Bellview Airlines Flight 210, a 737-200 (registration 5N-BFN) stalled and crashed shortly after taking off from Murtala Mohammed Airport in Lagos, Nigeria en route to the Nnamdi Azikiwe International Airport in Abuja, resulting of the deaths of all 117 occupants (111 passengers and 6 crew members).
 October 29, 2006 – ADC Airlines Flight 53, a 737-200 crashed during a storm shortly after takeoff from Nnamdi Azikiwe International Airport in Abuja, Nigeria. All but seven of the 104 passengers and crew died.
 January 24, 2007 – Air West Flight 612, a 737-200 was hijacked by a 26-year-old man, Mohamed Abdu Altif, who entered the cockpit of the aircraft approximately half an hour after takeoff from Khartoum International Airport in Sudan. The aircraft landed safely at N'Djamena International Airport in Chad where the hijacker surrendered. All 95 passengers and 8 crew on board survived.
 November 7, 2007 – Nationwide Airlines Flight 723, a 737-200, had its right engine fall off the wing as it took off from Cape Town, South Africa. The aircraft managed to return safely to the airport.
 August 24, 2008 – Iran Aseman Airlines Flight 6895, a 737-200 from Itek Air wet leased to Iran Aseman Airlines crashed while attempting an emergency landing at Bishkek, Kyrgyzstan, ten minutes after departure from there. The airliner was supposed to fly to Tehran, Iran. Out of 83 passengers and seven crew, there were 22 survivors.
 August 30, 2008 – Conviasa 737-200 Advanced registration YV-102T operating a ferry flight from Simón Bolívar International Airport in Maiquetía, Venezuela stalled and crashed into the Illiniza Volcano, Ecuador. One passenger and both pilots died.

2010s
 March 1, 2010 – Air Tanzania Flight 100, a 737-200 (5H-MVZ) sustained substantial damage when it departed the runway on landing at Mwanza Airport and the nose gear collapsed. Damage was also caused to an engine.
 August 20, 2010 – Chanchangi Airlines Flight 334, a 737-200 (5N-BIF), struck the localizer antenna and landed short of the runway at Kaduna Airport. Several passengers were slightly injured and the aircraft was substantially damaged. Chanchangi Airlines again suspended operations following the accident.
 August 20, 2011 – First Air Flight 6560, a 737-200, crashed near Resolute Bay in the Canadian territory of Nunavut. Of the fifteen people on board, there were three survivors.
 April 20, 2012 – Bhoja Air Flight 213, a 737-200, crashed in Rawalpindi, Pakistan. All 127 passengers and crew on board died.
 May 20, 2017 – Aeroméxico Flight 642 collided with a supply truck on a service road shortly after landing at Los Angeles International Airport. The collision flipped the truck onto its side, trapping one person inside. All 8 workers in the truck sustained non-life threatening injuries.
 May 18, 2018 – Global Air (Mexico), operating on lease as Cubana de Aviación Flight 972, crashed immediately after takeoff from José Martí International Airport. The crash killed all 6 crew members and 106 of the 107 passengers. The lone survivor suffered serious injuries. Investigators found errors in weight and balance calculations, which likely affected the stability at lift-off.

2020s
 July 2, 2021 – Transair Flight 810 – One engine on the Boeing 737-200 cargo aircraft failed en route from Honolulu to the neighboring Hawaiian island of Maui. Both pilots were rescued by the United States Coast Guard.

737 Classic (-300/-400/-500) aircraft

1980s
 May 24, 1988 – TACA Flight 110, en route to New Orleans, suffered double engine failure due to a severe hail storm. The pilot conducted a successful forced landing on a grass levee with no injuries. The aircraft was repaired and returned to service. As a result of this incident, further engine development was carried out to prevent flame-out in severe weather conditions.
 January 8, 1989 – Kegworth air disaster: British Midland Flight 92, using a 737-400, crashed on an embankment adjacent to the M1 motorway while attempting to land at East Midlands Airport. The aircraft broke apart on impact. Of the eight crew and 118 passengers, 47 passengers died. The left engine had suffered a fan blade fracture and the crew, unfamiliar with the 737-400, shut down the still-functional right engine, causing the aircraft to lose power.
 September 20, 1989 – USAir Flight 5050, a 737-400, drifted to the left and plunged into Bowery Bay at LaGuardia Airport after the crew attempted to abort the takeoff due to a mistrimmed rudder; 2 passengers died out of the 63 on board.

1990s
 May 11, 1990 – Philippine Airlines Flight 143, a 737-300 registered as EI-BZG, was due to fly from Ninoy Aquino International Airport in Manila to Mandurriao Airport in Iloilo City when the central fuel tank exploded while the aircraft was being pushed back from the terminal. Eight passengers among the 120 passengers and crew on board died in the explosion and subsequent fire.
 February 1, 1991 – USAir Flight 1493, operated by a 737-300, collided with a Fairchild Metro III of SkyWest Airlines while landing at Los Angeles. All 12 people on the Fairchild Metro died, while 21 passengers and two crew members out of six crew members and 83 passengers died on the 737.
 November 24, 1992 – China Southern Airlines Flight 3943, using a 737-300, crashed on descent to Guilin Liangjiang International Airport; 141 occupants died.
 July 26, 1993 – Asiana Airlines Flight 733, using a 737-500, crashed into a mountain; 68 of 116 occupants died.
 September 8, 1994 – USAir Flight 427, using a 737-300 with 127 passengers and five crew members, went out of control after a rudder malfunction and crashed near Pittsburgh International Airport; everyone on board died. The cause was determined to be the same as what caused the crash of United Airlines Flight 585, a 737-200, on March 3, 1991.
 December 29, 1994 – Turkish Airlines Flight 278, using a 737-400 registration TC-JES, en route from Esenboğa International Airport in Ankara, Turkey, crashed while attempting to land at Van Ferit Melen Airport in eastern Turkey. Five of the seven crew and 52 of the 69 passengers lost their lives, while the other two crew members and 17 passengers sustained serious injuries.
 May 8, 1997 – China Southern Airlines Flight 3456, using a 737-300, crashed while landing at Shenzhen; 35 of 65 passengers and two of nine crew members died.
 December 19, 1997 – SilkAir Flight 185, using a 737-300 with 97 passengers and seven crew members, crashed into a river in Indonesia; everyone on board died. 
 September 16, 1998 – Continental Airlines Flight 475, using a 737-500, encountered wind-shear while landing at Guadalajara, Mexico. None of the passengers and crew received injuries. The aircraft was written off.
 April 7, 1999 – Turkish Airlines Flight 5904, using a 737-400 with six crew members, crashed in Turkey. All of the crew on board died; there were no passengers on board.

2000s
 March 5, 2000 – Southwest Airlines Flight 1455, using a 737-300, overran the runway upon landing at Burbank, California, narrowly missing a gas station. All of the passengers and crew survived.
 March 3, 2001 – Thai Airways International Flight 114, a 737-400 bound for Chiang Mai from Bangkok, was destroyed by an explosion while on the ground, the result of ignition of the flammable fuel/air mixture in the tank. The source of the ignition energy for the explosion could not be determined with certainty, but the most likely source was an explosion originating at the center wing tank fuel pump as a result of running the pump in the presence of metal shavings and a fuel/air mixture. One flight attendant died; incident occurred prior to passenger boarding.
 January 16, 2002 – Garuda Indonesia Flight 421, using a 737-300, en route from Lombok to Yogyakarta, was forced to make an emergency landing on the Solo River. One person, a stewardess, died in the accident.
 May 7, 2002 – EgyptAir Flight 843, using a 737-500, crashed during approach to Tunis, Tunisia. Three of six crew members and 11 of 56 passengers died.
 January 3, 2004 – Flash Airlines Flight 604, using a 737-300 with 135 passengers and 13 crew members, crashed into the Red Sea, everyone on board died, making it the deadliest involving the Boeing 737 Classic.
 June 9, 2005 – 2005 Logan Airport runway incursion – A 737-300 operated by US Airways as US Airways Flight 1170 avoided collision with an Airbus A330 of Aer Lingus at Logan Airport in Boston, Massachusetts.
 August 14, 2005 – Helios Airways Flight 522, using a 737-300, suffered a gradual decompression which incapacitated five of the six crew members and all 115 passengers. The aircraft circled in the vicinity of Athens International Airport on its pre-programmed flight path before running out of fuel and crashing near Grammatiko; everyone on board died.
 January 23, 2006 – Continental Airlines flight 1515, a Boeing 737-500, was set to depart from El Paso International Airport for George Bush Intercontinental Airport, when the right engine suffered an oil leak. The Captain was asked by the mechanics to run the engine up to 70% for three minutes. Shortly after the power was increased, one of the mechanics stood up, stepped into the inlet hazard zone, and died instantly when he was ingested into the engine.
 June 15, 2006 – TNT Airways Flight 352, using a 737-300 freighter and operating from Liège Airport in Belgium to London Stansted Airport in the United Kingdom had to divert to East Midlands Airport due to bad weather. On final approach, the autopilot was disengaged for a short period. The aircraft touched down off the runway to the left, resulting in the right main landing gear being detached and the right wing tip and engine scraping the ground. The pilots managed to lift off again and subsequently made an emergency diversion to Birmingham International Airport, where a landing was performed on the remaining two landing gear, during which the aircraft scraped on its nose and right engine. There were no injuries. The cause of the crash was determined to be a poorly timed message from local air traffic control which the pilot misinterpreted, causing him to descend too quickly. The team of pilots were said by the airline to have managed the situation with skill once the error had been detected, but were dismissed from service with the company as a result of the incident.
 October 3, 2006 – Turkish Airlines Flight 1476, using a 737-400, was hijacked by Hakan Ekinci in Greek airspace. All 107 passengers and six crew members on board survived. The aircraft landed safely at Brindisi Airport in Italy.
 January 1, 2007 – Adam Air Flight 574, using a 737-400 with 96 passengers and six crew members aboard, crashed off the coast of Sulawesi. All 102 people on board died. 

 February 21, 2007 – Adam Air Flight 172, using a 737-300, suffered a structural failure when landing at Juanda International Airport. All of the passengers and crew survived.
 March 7, 2007 – Garuda Indonesia Flight 200, using a 737-400, crashed upon landing at Adisucipto International Airport. Of 133 passengers and seven crew members, 20 passengers and one crew member died.
 September 14, 2008 – Aeroflot Flight 821, using an Aeroflot-Nord-operated 737-500, crashed shortly before its scheduled arrival at Perm, Russia. All 82 passengers and six crew members died.
 December 20, 2008 – Continental Airlines Flight 1404, a 737-500, veered off the runway and caught fire at Denver International Airport during an attempted departure. There were no casualties.
 July 13, 2009 – Southwest Airlines Flight 2294, while airborne, had an American football-shaped hole appear due to metal fatigue, and made an emergency landing at Charleston, West Virginia. All 131 on board survived. The aircraft at the time had 42,500 flight cycles and 50,500 flight hours. Boeing had calculated that 737 models of that generation would not require inspection for hairline cracks until 60,000 cycles.

2010s
 January 16, 2010 – A UTair Aviation Boeing 737-500, VQ-BAC, departed the runway on landing at Vnukovo International Airport and was substantially damaged when the nosewheel collapsed.
 April 13, 2010 – Merpati Nusantara Airlines Flight 836, using 737-300 PK-MDE, overran the runway at Rendani Airport, Manokwari, Indonesia and broke in two. All 103 passengers and six crew escaped alive.
 November 2, 2010 – Lion Air Flight 712, using Boeing 737-400 PK-LIQ, overran the runway on landing at Supadio Airport in Pontianak, Indonesia, coming to rest on its belly. All 174 passengers and crew evacuated by the emergency chutes, with few injuries reported.
 April 1, 2011 – Southwest Airlines Flight 812 had a six-foot tear in the upper fuselage, also caused by metal fatigue, on a flight from Phoenix Sky Harbor Airport to Sacramento International Airport, and diverted to a military base in Yuma, Arizona after an emergency descent. One minor injury was reported.
 November 17, 2013 – Tatarstan Airlines Flight 363, a 737-500, crashed near Kazan International Airport, Russia, en route from Moscow; all 44 passengers and six crew on board died.
 November 22, 2015 – Avia Traffic Company Flight 768, a 737-300 registration EX-37005, touched down hard at Osh Airport injuring eight, and causing all the landing gear to be ripped off. The aircraft skidded off the runway and the left engine was torn from its mounting.
 August 5, 2016 – ASL Airlines Hungary Flight 7332, a 737-400 in cargo configuration registered HA-FAX, landed on Milan Bergamo's Orio al Serio Airport but overran the runway. The aircraft broke through the airport perimeter fence, a parking lot, a guardrail and came to a stop on a road 520 meters past the end of the runway. The aircraft sustained substantial damage, losing both engines and all landing gear legs. Of the two flight crew members, only the captain was injured.
 December 26, 2016 – Jet Airways Flight 2374 landed in Goa International Airport and was scheduled for Mumbai International Airport. After aligning, the aircraft began to takeoff but suddenly the plane veered right and took a 360° spin. Out of 154 passengers, 14 suffered injuries. Luckily, there were no fatalities.
 March 28, 2017 – Peruvian Airlines Flight 112, a 737-300, departed from Jorge Chávez International Airport and landed in Francisco Carle Airport in Jauja where it suffered an undercarriage failure, causing a forced landing and then catching fire. All 138 passengers and crew survived after a fast evacuation. Thirty-nine of the passengers were taken to the hospital. The aircraft was declared a total loss.

2020s
 January 9, 2021 – Sriwijaya Air Flight 182, a Boeing 737-524 with registration PK-CLC, took off from Jakarta to Pontianak. After reaching an altitude of 10,900 feet, the left engine thrust decreased while the right engine thrust remained in place, the flight experienced an upset and rolled to the left and it quickly descended and lost radio contact in the Thousand Islands area of the Java Sea. There were 62 people on board consisting of 50 passengers, six operating crew members, and six other crew members traveling as passengers. All people on board were killed. It was caused by an auto throttle failure leading to pilot error.
 February 6, 2023 – A Coulson Aviation 737-300 Large Air Tanker (LAT) with registration N619SW contracted to the Western Australian Department of Fire and Emergency Services (DFES) crashed whilst fighting a fire at the Fitzgerald River National Park near Ravensthorpe, Western Australia. Both crew members survived the accident. This accident is the first and only crash involving a Boeing 737 of any variant in Australia.

737 Next Generation (-600/-700/-800/-900) aircraft

Fatal accidents 
 
 
 
 

 
 
 
 
 

February 5, 2020: Pegasus Airlines Flight 2193 operated by a Boeing 737-800, on a flight from İzmir, skidded off the runway at Istanbul Sabiha Gökçen International Airport before splitting into three pieces of fuselage, leaving 3 dead and 179 injured.
August 7, 2020: Air India Express Flight 1344, operated by a Boeing 737-800, overshot the runway during landing in heavy rain and crashed into a gorge at Calicut International Airport; both pilots and 19 passengers on board died.
 March 21, 2022: China Eastern Airlines Flight 5735, operated by a Boeing 737-800, crashed while en-route from Kunming Changshui International Airport to Guangzhou Baiyun International Airport. The aircraft was carrying 132 occupants, all of whom died.

Hull losses

Other incidents 

 
 
 
 
 
 August 22, 2022, Alaska Airlines Flight 558, a 737-900, experienced vibrations soon after takeoff in a flight from Seattle-Tacoma International Airport to San Diego. The aircraft turned around for an emergency landing at Sea-Tac, during which the left engine cowling cover blew off. There were no injuries or fatalities.
 January 18, 2023, Qantas Flight 144, a 737-800, registered VH-XZB, flying from Auckland International Airport to Sydney Kingsford Smith Airport, suffered an uncontrolled engine failure while flying over the Tasman Sea. It made a safe landing at Sydney at 3:19 pm.

737 MAX (737 MAX 7/8/200/9/10) aircraft

References

Boeing 737

Accidents and incidents involving airliners
Boeing 737